Thomas George Baker (born 6 April 1936, in Maerdy) is a former  Welsh international footballer. He was widely known as George Baker.

Club career
Originally a winger, Baker joined Plymouth Argyle as a teenager in the early 1950s. He made his first team debut in October 1954, but appeared sporadically over the next three years, as he developed his game playing for the club's reserve team in the Plymouth & District, Devon Wednesday, and Football Combination Leagues. He became a first team regular in 1958, and played an important part in the club's Third Division title campaign a year later. After that success, Baker sustained a knee injury which eventually brought his career at Home Park to an end. He scored 17 goals in all competitions for the club and made 83 appearances. He joined Shrewsbury Town in 1961, who were under the management of Arthur Rowley. He played in the match where Rowley broke Dixie Dean's record for most goals scored in the Football League. After 5 goals in 52 appearances, Baker returned to South Wales in 1962 to play for Barry Town, where he finished his career playing in the Southern League.

International career
He was a member of the Wales squad which participated in the 1958 FIFA World Cup in Sweden. Wales progressed to the quarter-finals of the competition, where they were knocked out by Brazil, but Baker was an unused substitute in all five matches. He played twice for his country at under-23 level, against England in 1958, and Scotland in 1959.

Personal life
After retiring from football Baker was an executive for an opencast mining company in south Wales. He settled in Tylorstown by 2008.

Honours
Plymouth Argyle
Third Division: 1958–59

References

1936 births
Living people
People from Rhondda
Welsh footballers
Wales under-23 international footballers
Plymouth Argyle F.C. players
Shrewsbury Town F.C. players
Barry Town United F.C. players
English Football League players
Southern Football League players
1958 FIFA World Cup players
Association football wingers